Egesina subfasciata is a species of beetle in the family Cerambycidae. It was described by Maurice Pic in 1926. It is known from Thailand, Vietnam, China, and Laos.

References

Egesina
Beetles described in 1926